Pseudosphex spitzi is a moth of the subfamily Arctiinae. It was described by Zerny in 1931. It is found in Brazil.

References

Moths described in 1931
Moths of South America
Pseudosphex